The 2023 Premier Volleyball League (PVL) season is the sixth season of the Premier Volleyball League (19th season of the former Shakey's V-League) that started on February 4, 2023, with the 2023 Premier Volleyball League All-Filipino Conference.

All-Filipino conference

Participating teams

Preliminary round

Final round

Awards

Final standings

Conference results

See also 
 2023 Spikers' Turf season

References

2023 in Philippine sport

2023 in women's volleyball
Current volleyball seasons